The Greek Volley League 2018–19 championship is the 51st National championship and the 9th under the Volleyleague name. The championship started on Saturday 20 October 2018 and the regular season is scheduled to complete on Saturday 30 March 2019.

Teams 
Ten teams participate in 2018–19 Volleyleage. Teams in positions 1−8 from 2017–18, the two winning teams from 2017-18 Volleyleagur Play outs and two teams promoted from 2017–18 A2 Ethniki
Specifically:
Teams in positions 1-8 of 2017–18 Volleyleague regular season: Olympiacos Piraeus, PAOK, Foinikas Syros, Kifissia,  Iraklis Thessaloniki, Iraklis Chalkidas, Ethnikos Piraeus, Pamvohaikos Vocha.
Teams in positions 1-2 on 2017–18 Volleyleague play outs: Ethnikos Alexandroupolis and Panathinaikos.
Teams promoted from 2017–18 A2 Ethniki: AEK, AE Komotini
Teams relegated from 2017–18 Volleyleague: Niki Aiginiou and Panachaiki.
 Ethnikos Piraeus withdrew from 2018–19 Volleyleague Greece due to financial reasons.
 Iraklis Chalkidas withdrew from 2018–19 Volleyleague Greece due to not granted licence.

Regular season 
Regular season takes place in round robin format with each team playing all other teams twice. Teams in positions 1-8 advance in  Playoffs positions 1−8, while teams in positions 9-10 will play each other to avoid relegation

Results

Standings

Playoffs positions 1-8 
The teams that finish in the top eight after the regular season advance to the play-offs.

References

External links 
 Προκήρυξη πρωταθλημάτων πετοαφαίρισης 2018–19 www.volleyball.gr
 Προεπισκόπηση του Πρωταθλήματος 2018–19 www.volleyleague.gr
 Δυναμικό και εμβλήματα των ομάδων του Πρωταθλήματος 2018–19 www.volleyleague.gr
 Αποτελέσματα Πρωταθλήματος 2018–19 www.volleyleague.gr

Volleyball competitions in Greece
2018 in Greek sport
2019 in Greek sport
Greece